Diese Drombuschs is a German television series that originally aired on ZDF for six seasons from 1983 to 1994. The show revolves around a typical German middle class family living in the city of Darmstadt.

Cast
Witta Pohl as Vera Drombusch
Hans-Peter Korff as Siegfried Drombusch (season 1-3)
Grete Wurm as Margarete Drombusch
Mick Werup as Christian "Chris" Drombusch (season 1-5)
Sabine Kaack as Marion Drombusch #1 (season 1-5)
 as Marion Drombusch #2 (season 6)
Eike Hagen Schweikhardt as Thomas "Thomi" Drombusch
Günter Strack as Ludwig Burlitz (season 2-6)
Marion Kracht as Bettina "Tina" Drombusch, née Reibold (season 2-6)
Michael Degen as Dr. Martin Sanders (season 3-4)
Constanze Engelbrecht as Brigitte Sanders (season 3-4)
Anja Jaenicke as Yvonne Boxheimer (season 4-6)

See also
List of German television series

External links
 

1983 German television series debuts
1994 German television series endings
Television shows set in Hesse
German-language television shows
ZDF original programming